Lost is a 2021 South Korean television series starring Jeon Do-yeon, Ryu Jun-yeol, Park Byung-eun and Kim Hyo-jin. Labelled as "JTBC's Tenth Anniversary Special Project", it aired from September 4 to October 24, 2021 on Saturdays and Sundays at 22:30 (KST) time slot. It is also available for streaming on iQIYI.

Synopsis
It tells the story of ordinary people who have worked hard all their lives to see the spotlight, but suddenly realize that "nothing has happened" in the middle of the downhill road of life.

Cast

Main
 Jeon Do-yeon as Bu-jeong, a ghostwriter who wants to write an original work in her own name. She has tried her best in life, but suddenly encounters a failure and loses reason to live.
 Ryu Jun-yeol as Kang-jae, a man facing the end of his youth who is afraid of "being nothing". He grew up poor and dreams to become rich. He runs a service company that organizes people to take on different roles required by clients.
 Park Byung-eun as Jung-soo, Bu-jeong's husband who is a food store management team leader in a department store.
 Kim Hyo-jin as Kyung-eun, Jung-soo's first love.

Supporting

People around Bu-jeong
 Park In-hwan as Chang-suk, Bu-jeong's father.
 Shin Shin-ae as Min-ja, Jung-soo's mother.
 Park Ji-young as Ah-ran, an actress and a best-selling author.

People around Kang-jae
 Yoo Su-bin as Tak / Sun-joo (real name), Kang-jae's best friend.
 Son Na-eun as Min-jung, Kang-jae's friend who is a former idol trainee.
 Jo Eun-ji as Sun-gyu, a pharmacist.
 Yang Dong-geun as Woo-nam, a nurse in the intensive care unit.
 Kang Ji-eun as Mi-sun, Kang-jae's mother.
 Lee Seo-hwan as Jang-gyu, Mi-sun's housemate.
 Ryu Ji-hun as Jong-hun, host team leader.
 Na Hyun-woo as Jung-woo, a host.

Others
 Oh Kwang-rok as Jin-seop, an actor.
 Lee Se-na as Ji-na, Jin-seop's lover.
 Kang Hyung-seok as Jun-hyuk, Jung-soo's co-worker.

Production
Lost is the first-ever television project of film director Hur Jin-ho. It also marks lead stars Jeon Do-yeon and Ryu Jun-yeol's small screen comeback after five years.

It was reported that the first script reading of the cast was held on January 6, 2021.

Viewership

Notes

References

External links
  
 
 

JTBC television dramas
Korean-language television shows
2021 South Korean television series debuts
2021 South Korean television series endings
South Korean melodrama television series
Television series by C-JeS Entertainment
Television series by Drama House